Tănăsescu is a Romanian surname that may refer to:

Florin-Teodor Tănăsescu (born 1932), Romanian electrical engineer
Ion Tănăsescu (chemist) (1892–1959)
Ion Tănăsescu (surgeon) (1875–1954)
Mihai Tănăsescu (born 1956)
Tudor Tănăsescu (1901–1961)

Romanian-language surnames